Sorgfjorden is a fjord at the northeastern coast of Spitsbergen, Svalbard. It cuts into Ny-Friesland, from the northern part of Hinlopen Strait. It is also called Treurenberg Bay.

References

Fjords of Spitsbergen